Hypoponera is a genus of ants in the subfamily Ponerinae. The genus has a worldwide distribution and is found in all continents except Antarctica.

Species

Hypoponera abeillei (André, 1881)
Hypoponera agilis (Borgmeier, 1934)
Hypoponera albopubescens (Menozzi, 1939)
Hypoponera aliena (Smith, 1858)
Hypoponera angustata (Santschi, 1914)
Hypoponera aprora Bolton & Fisher, 2011
Hypoponera argentina (Santschi, 1922)
Hypoponera assmuthi (Forel, 1905)
†Hypoponera atavia (Mayr, 1868)
Hypoponera austra Bolton & Fisher, 2011
Hypoponera beebei (Wheeler, 1924)
Hypoponera beppin Terayama, 1999
Hypoponera biroi (Emery, 1900)
Hypoponera blanda Bolton & Fisher, 2011
Hypoponera boerorum (Forel, 1901)
Hypoponera bugnioni (Forel, 1912)
Hypoponera bulawayensis (Forel, 1913)
Hypoponera butteli (Forel, 1913)
Hypoponera camerunensis (Santschi, 1914)
Hypoponera ceylonensis (Mayr, 1897)
Hypoponera clavatula (Emery, 1906)
Hypoponera coeca (Santschi, 1914)
Hypoponera collegiana (Santschi, 1925)
Hypoponera comis Bolton & Fisher, 2011
Hypoponera confinis (Roger, 1860)
Hypoponera congrua (Wheeler, 1934)
Hypoponera convexiuscula (Forel, 1900)
Hypoponera creola (Menozzi, 1931)
Hypoponera decora (Clark, 1934)
Hypoponera defessa Bolton & Fisher, 2011
Hypoponera dema Bolton & Fisher, 2011
Hypoponera dis Bolton & Fisher, 2011
Hypoponera distinguenda (Emery, 1890)
Hypoponera dulcis (Forel, 1907)
Hypoponera eduardi (Forel, 1894)
Hypoponera elliptica (Forel, 1900)
Hypoponera emeryi (Donisthorpe, 1943)
Hypoponera ergatandria (Forel, 1893)
Hypoponera eutrepta (Wilson, 1958)
Hypoponera exigua Bolton & Fisher, 2011
Hypoponera exoecata (Wheeler, 1928)
Hypoponera faceta (Menozzi, 1931)
Hypoponera faex Bolton & Fisher, 2011
Hypoponera fatiga Bolton & Fisher, 2011
Hypoponera fenestralis (Gallardo, 1918)
Hypoponera fiebrigi (Forel, 1908)
Hypoponera foeda (Forel, 1893)
Hypoponera foreli (Mayr, 1887)
Hypoponera gibbinota (Forel, 1912)
Hypoponera gracilicornis (Menozzi, 1931)
Hypoponera grandidieri (Santschi, 1921)
Hypoponera hawkesi Bolton & Fisher, 2011
Hypoponera hebes Bolton & Fisher, 2011
Hypoponera herbertonensis (Forel, 1915)
Hypoponera idelettae (Santschi, 1923)
Hypoponera ignavia Bolton & Fisher, 2011
Hypoponera ignigera (Menozzi, 1927)
Hypoponera iheringi (Forel, 1908)
Hypoponera importuna Bolton & Fisher, 2011
Hypoponera inaudax (Santschi, 1919)
Hypoponera indigens (Forel, 1895)
Hypoponera inexorata (Wheeler, 1903)
Hypoponera jeanneli (Santschi, 1935)
Hypoponera jocosa Bolton & Fisher, 2011
Hypoponera johannae (Forel, 1891)
Hypoponera juxta Bolton & Fisher, 2011
Hypoponera lamellosa (Forel, 1907)
Hypoponera lassa Bolton & Fisher, 2011
Hypoponera lea (Santschi, 1937)
Hypoponera leninei (Santschi, 1925)
Hypoponera lepida Bolton & Fisher, 2011
Hypoponera longiceps (Forel, 1913)
Hypoponera ludovicae (Forel, 1892)
Hypoponera lumpurensis (Forel, 1907)
Hypoponera mackayensis (Forel, 1900)
Hypoponera macradelphe (Wilson, 1958)
Hypoponera madecassa (Santschi, 1938)
Hypoponera malayana (Wheeler, 1929)
Hypoponera massiliensis (Bondroit, 1920)
Hypoponera menozzii (Santschi, 1932)
Hypoponera meridia Bolton & Fisher, 2011
Hypoponera mixta Bolton & Fisher, 2011
Hypoponera molesta Bolton & Fisher, 2011
Hypoponera monticola (Mann, 1921)
Hypoponera natalensis (Santschi, 1914)
Hypoponera neglecta (Santschi, 1923)
Hypoponera nippona (Santschi, 1937)
Hypoponera nitidula (Emery, 1890)
Hypoponera nivariana (Santschi, 1908)
Hypoponera nubatama Terayama & Hashimoto, 1996
Hypoponera obtunsa Bolton & Fisher, 2011
Hypoponera occidentalis (Bernard, 1953)
Hypoponera odiosa Bolton & Fisher, 2011
Hypoponera opaciceps (Mayr, 1887)
Hypoponera opacior (Forel, 1893)
Hypoponera orba (Emery, 1915)
Hypoponera pallidula (Emery, 1900)
Hypoponera papuana (Emery, 1900)
Hypoponera parva (Forel, 1909)
Hypoponera perparva Bolton & Fisher, 2011
Hypoponera perplexa (Mann, 1922)
Hypoponera pia (Forel, 1901)
Hypoponera producta Bolton & Fisher, 2011
Hypoponera pruinosa (Emery, 1900)
Hypoponera pulchra Bolton & Fisher, 2011
Hypoponera punctatissima (Roger, 1859)
Hypoponera punctiventris (Emery, 1901)
Hypoponera pygmaea (Forel, 1907)
Hypoponera quaestio Bolton & Fisher, 2011
Hypoponera queenslandensis (Forel, 1900)
Hypoponera ragusai (Emery, 1894)
Hypoponera rectidens (Clark, 1934)
Hypoponera regis Bolton & Fisher, 2011
Hypoponera reichenspergeri (Santschi, 1923)
Hypoponera rigida Bolton & Fisher, 2011
Hypoponera sabronae (Donisthorpe, 1941)
Hypoponera sakalava (Forel, 1891)
Hypoponera sauteri Onoyama, 1989
Hypoponera schmalzi (Emery, 1896)
Hypoponera schwebeli (Forel, 1913)
Hypoponera scitula (Clark, 1934)
Hypoponera segnis Bolton & Fisher, 2011
Hypoponera silvestrii (Donisthorpe, 1947)
Hypoponera sinuosa (Bernard, 1953)
Hypoponera siremps (Forel, 1901)
Hypoponera sororcula (Wilson, 1958)
Hypoponera spei (Forel, 1910)
Hypoponera stoica (Santschi, 1912)
Hypoponera sulcatinasis (Santschi, 1914)
Hypoponera sulciceps (Clark, 1928)
Hypoponera surda Bolton & Fisher, 2011
Hypoponera taprobanae (Forel, 1913)
Hypoponera tecta Bolton & Fisher, 2011
Hypoponera tenella (Emery, 1901)
Hypoponera traegaordhi (Santschi, 1914)
Hypoponera transvaalensis (Arnold, 1947)
Hypoponera trigona (Mayr, 1887)
Hypoponera tristis Bolton & Fisher, 2011
Hypoponera truncata (Smith, 1860)
Hypoponera turaga (Mann, 1921)
Hypoponera ursa (Santschi, 1924)
Hypoponera vanreesi (Forel, 1912)
Hypoponera venusta Bolton & Fisher, 2011
Hypoponera vernacula (Kempf, 1962)
Hypoponera viri (Santschi, 1923)
Hypoponera vitiensis (Mann, 1921)
Hypoponera wilsoni (Santschi, 1925)
Hypoponera zwaluwenburgi (Wheeler, 1933)

References

External links

Ponerinae
Ant genera
Taxa named by Felix Santschi